KDXL (106.5 FM) was a student operated radio station at St. Louis Park High School in St. Louis Park, Minnesota.  The station's frequency was 106.5, which it shared with the University of Minnesota's KUOM-FM in a timesharing agreement. The station was owned by Independent School District #283.

History
The station began in 1973 with a low-power signal that could only reach a portion of St. Louis Park High School; during this period, the station used the call signs WHAT, WSLP, and KTS. In 1977, the Federal Communications Commission (FCC) granted the school district a license to operate a 10-watt radio station, which took the call sign KDXL. KDXL operated at 91.7 through 1985; it changed frequencies so that it would not have a frequency close to KQRS-FM.

Independent School District #283 voted to shut down KDXL on June 25, 2018; the following day, it informed the FCC that the station would cease operations on July 1. The license was cancelled on July 16, 2018.

References

External links

Radio stations in Minnesota
Radio stations established in 1977
1977 establishments in Minnesota
Radio stations disestablished in 2018
2018 disestablishments in Minnesota
Defunct radio stations in the United States
Defunct mass media in Minnesota